A Present from the Past is a compilation album by the Swedish rock band The Soundtrack of Our Lives.

The album consists of tracks from B-sides and out of print EPs, as well as previously unreleased material.

Track listing

CD 1

CD 2

References

External links
Official site
Official US site
VH1 artist site
MTV artist site

The Soundtrack of Our Lives albums
2005 albums